No More Loud Music is a singles collection of the Belgian rock band dEUS, released in 2001. In contains, in chronological order, the singles from the albums Worst Case Scenario, In a Bar, Under the Sea and The Ideal Crash, and one new single, "Nothing Really Ends".

Track listing

Deus (band) albums
2001 compilation albums
Island Records compilation albums